Ramoty may refer to the following places:
Ramoty, Podlaskie Voivodeship (north-east Poland)
Ramoty, Pomeranian Voivodeship (north Poland)
Ramoty, Warmian-Masurian Voivodeship (north Poland)